Madeleine de Bourbon-Busset (23 March 1898 – 1 September 1984) was the titular Duchess of Parma and Piacenza (from 1974) and was also Carlist Queen of Spain (from 1952) as the consort of Prince Xavier of Bourbon-Parma, the Carlist pretender to the Spanish throne.

Life and family
She was born of a cadet branch of the Bourbon Counts of Busset, male-line descendants of Louis de Bourbon (1437–1482), prince du sang, Bishop of Liège, allegedly by a liaison with Catherine de Gueldres. Her father was Georges de Bourbon-Busset, Count de Lignières (1860–1932), and her mother Marie Jeanne née de Kerret-Quillien (1866–1958).

Prince Xavier, a younger son of Robert I, Duke of Parma, and Madeleine were wed on 12 November 1927 at the château de Lignières in Cher. The couple took up residence in the Bourbonnais, where Xavier managed Madeleine's farm lands. The marriage was accepted as dynastic at the time by neither Prince Elias of Bourbon-Parma (Xavier's elder half-brother, then acting head of the House of Bourbon-Parma), nor by the senior Bourbons of the Spanish branch (Alfonso XIII), but was later recognized by the Parmesan Duke Robert Hugo, and by the Carlist pretender Alfonso Carlos, Duke of San Jaime.

In 1936, Alfonso Carlos, the last undisputed head of the Carlist movement, appointed her husband Xavier as Carlist "regent". Madeleine actively supported her husband's political activities and social views. Madeleine was the author of "Catherine de Médicis", published in France in 1940.

The couple had issue:

 Princess Marie Françoise of Bourbon-Parma (born 19 August 1928), she married Prince Edouard de Lobkowicz (1926–2010) and had issue;
 Prince Carlos Hugo of Bourbon-Parma (8 April 1930 – 18 August 2010), Duke of Parma and Piacenza as head of the house of Bourbon-Parma, "Carlist" King of Spain. He married Princess Irene of the Netherlands and had issue;
 Princess Marie Thérèse of Bourbon-Parma (28 July 1933 – 26 March 2020), victim of COVID-19;
 Princess Cécile Marie of Bourbon-Parma (12 April 1935 – 1 September 2021), she was named Countess of Poblet by her father. She never got married;
 Princess Marie des Neiges of Bourbon-Parma (born 29 April 1937), she was named Countess of Castillo de la Mota by her father. She never got married; 
 Prince Sixtus Henry of Bourbon-Parma (born 22 July 1940), he was named Duke of Aranjuez by his father. He never got married;

Ancestry

References and notes

|-

1898 births
1984 deaths
French nobility
Madeleine
Princesses by marriage
Madeleine
Madeleine